Jyothishmathi College of Engineering and Technology is an engineering college in Ranga Reddy district of Telangana, India recognized by All India Council for Technical Education(AICTE) and affiliated to the Jawaharlal Nehru Technological University, Hyderabad. It is often referred to as JCET.

It was founded by Shalini Vidya Samstha, Situated over a sprawling 40 acre campus in Turkapally Village of Ranga Reddy District.

Departments

Graduate:
 Computer Science Engineering - 120
 Electronics & Communication Engineering - 120
 Electrical & Electronics Engineering - 60
Post Graduate:
 M. Tech -Embedded Systems - 18
 M. Tech -VLSI - 18
 M. Tech -Computer Science Engineering - 18
 Master of Business Administration - 60
Diploma(POLYTECHNIC):
 Electronics & Communication Engineering - 120
 Electrical & Electronics Engineering - 60

Facilities

Library

The College has a very big library which contains 30,000 books, periodicals research journals, magazines, newspapers. The digital Library of the college has a collection of over 1100 CDs of educational media.

Labs

The college has many labs equipped with all the necessary items. As the college has Aeronautical Engineering branch, it has a special lab for it which provides all the necessary machines to the students.

Cafeteria

The college has a cafeteria within the building which only serves as the breakout area for the students.

College Bus

The college has transport facility which connects all the major parts of the city to the College. Students need to enroll to the service to avail the transport facility.

Sister Colleges and Schools

 Jyothishmathi Institute of Technology & Science (JMTS), Karimnagar
 Jyothishmathi Institute of Technological Sciences (JMTK), Karimnagar 
 Jyothishmathi Institute of Pharmaceutical Sciences (JMIP), Karimnagar 
 Jyothishmathi College of Engineering & Technology (JETT), Shamirpet, Hyderabad
 Jyothishmathi College of Pharmacy (JCPT),Shamirpet, Hyderabad
 Jyothishmathi College of Education, Karimnagar
 Jyothishmathi College of Physical Education (JSKR), Karimnagar
 Jyothishmathi Academy (CBSE School), Karimnagar

See also
All India Council for Technical Education
Jawaharlal Nehru Technological University, Hyderabad
Education in India
List of institutions of higher education in Telangana

References

External links
Official Website
Main Branch

Engineering colleges in Hyderabad, India
2004 establishments in Andhra Pradesh
Educational institutions established in 2004